Hokas Pokas! is a collection of science fiction stories, as well as the novel Star Prince Charlie, by American writer Poul Anderson and Gordon R. Dickson.  It was first published by Baen Books in 2000.  The stories originally appeared in the magazines Fantasy and Science Fiction and Analog Science Fiction and Fact.

Contents

 "Full Pack"
 "The Napoleon Crime"
 Star Prince Charlie

Sources

External links 
 

2000 short story collections
Short story collections by Poul Anderson
Short story collections by Gordon R. Dickson
Books with cover art by Michael Whelan